Yang Hengjun ( born 1965 in Hubei, China) whose legal name is Yang Jun, is a Chinese-Australian writer and blogger.

According to Yang's own accounts, he studied at Fudan University. After graduating, Yang worked in the Ministry of Foreign Affairs in Beijing. China's Foreign Ministry denied Yang had ever been employed by the ministry, according to a Reuters report in 2019. From 1992 to 1997, Yang worked in Hong Kong as the manager of a mainland Chinese company. Afterwards, he went to the U.S. as a senior fellow of the Atlantic Council. Yang is believed to have become an Australian citizen in the early 2000s, while still holding a PRC passport. Yang is regarded as a divisive figure among overseas Chinese dissidents and activists. Yang is currently under arrest by the Chinese Government, facing one charge of espionage, but the basis of the charge was unknown.

Personal life
Yang has been a visiting scholar at Columbia University in New York for two years before being detained in China in January 2019. Yang is married to a prominent nationalist blogger, Yuan Ruijuan (alternate: Yuan Xiaoliang).

Career
According to The New York Times, Yang was a diplomat for the People's Republic of China, working in the Ministry of Foreign Affairs. The Foreign Ministry denied Yang had ever been employed by the ministry, according to a Reuters report in 2019.

Based on his abundant personal experience "within the Chinese system", Yang wrote spy novels in English and Chinese, under the pen name Wei Shi. His first novel, Fatal Weakness, is the first in his spy trilogy using himself as a role model. It is the story of a U.S.-China double agent who ultimately works for neither side but instead serves his own personal agenda.  It is only available on his blog and is written only in Chinese. There are no other translations available.

In U.S., Yang spent most of his time running a “daigou” store on China's popular mobile platform WeChat, selling luxury bags, vitamins, baby formula and watches procured overseas for buyers inside China.
Some critics said Yang stopped criticising the ruling Chinese Communist Party in favour of protecting his personal and business interests.

Detentions

2011
On 20 March 2011, it was alleged Yang disappeared from Guangzhou airport after phoning a friend to report that three men were following him. Commentators believe that he was detained as a result of government crackdown on activists, lawyers and bloggers following calls for a 'Jasmine' revolution in China since February 2011. He later contacted his family in Australia saying his disappearance was all a "misunderstanding" and "I've been sick, nothing else, and my phone battery was dead for two days so I could not contact my family. I'm very sorry about stirring up so much trouble in both countries."

2019
On 18 January 2019, he was again detained by Chinese authorities. He had arrived in Guangzhou from the U.S. due to the imminent expiry of his family's visas, with his wife and daughter. He was awaiting Australian visas for his wife and daughter. During a connection, he was arrested while on his way to the connecting flight to Shanghai. Yang's detention was believed to relate to his international connections, according to Feng Chongyi, an academic at the University of Technology in Sydney.

Yang was charged with espionage in August 2019. Australian barrister Julian McMahon is said to be assisting with the case. Sentences for espionage under Chinese law range from 3 years imprisonment, to death.

On 29 August 2019, Australian Prime Minister Scott Morrison told Nine News, "These suggestions that he's acted as a spy for Australia are absolutely untrue and we'll be protecting and seeking to support our citizen, as we have been doing now for some period of time,"

On 21 May 2021 the Australian foreign minister, Marise Payne, in a statement on Yang's upcoming trial, said that "despite repeated requests from Australian diplomats Chinese authorities have not provided any explanation or evidence for the charges facing Dr Yang”, and called on Chinese authorities to allow access to his lawyer and to Australian consular officials in advance of his trial. A spokesman for the Chinese embassy in Canberra responded to Payne’s “deplorable” comments and called on Australia to respect China’s judicial sovereignty. 

In a letter dictated from prison in March 2021, Yang said he has been interrogated over 300 times by many different people, sometimes while shackled and blindfolded and as a result of his 26 month detainment he had experienced a decline in health. He also expressed the hope that he could one day return to Australia, where he might "have more chances to tell readers what’s going on around the world, and what’s going on in me. If I get out, I will write articles to improve Australia-China relations and that will help China to understand the world, and the world to understand China.”

2021 Trial 
On 27 May 2021, after 28 months in custody, Yang appeared before a closed-door court in Beijing, charged with espionage. Wearing full protective suit, mask and goggles, despite Beijing recording no new community transmission of COVID-19 for almost four months, Yang pleaded not guilty. Australian consular officials were barred from observing the trial despite a bilateral agreement that is supposed to ensure access to court hearings involving Australian citizens in China. 

On 31 May the Associated Press published Yang's account of the trial as circulated amongst his friends, in which he told supporters he had asked for the judge to reject evidence of what he had said while being tortured by interrogators. Yang also said the judge refused his request to submit evidence and call witnesses in his defense, though he agreed to attach nearly 100 pages of defense material to Yang's case file. 

In January 2022, it was reported that Yang, who along with the Australian government continued to maintain his innocence, was suffering from seriously deteriorating health. Observers considered it nevertheless unlikely that he would be released before his sentencing scheduled, after repeated delays, for 9 April 2022.

Political activism
During the 2008 Summer Olympics torch relay and ensuing protests, Yang called for Chinese students in Australia to show restraint, and warned that overt Chinese nationalism might create racial tensions between Asians and white Australians.

See also
 Hostage diplomacy

References

External links
 Yang's Twitter account
 http://www.yanghengjun.com/ – Collection of blog articles, some in English
 Yang's blog posts translated on China Digital Times

1965 births
Living people
Chinese dissidents
Chinese emigrants to Australia
Fudan University alumni
Writers from Hubei